There are 13 heliports within Washington, D.C., the federal capital district of the United States, as of 2021. As of 2002, there are also 32 others in the Washington metropolitan area. Of this total, 22 belong to hospitals, 12 to other corporations or private owners, 10 government, three military, and one public.

No active facilities for fixed-wing aircraft exist within the geographically small and densely populated city. The district has not had any such facilities since 1962, when NAS Anacostia and Bolling AFB demolished their runways and abolished their seaplane base on the Potomac River. Airports associated with DC (such as Dulles, Reagan, or Baltimore/Washington) are instead located nearby in Virginia or Maryland.

The White House does not have its own heliport, but uses the South Lawn, with portable communications equipment brought out for Marine One arrivals and departures.

Heliports in D.C.

South Capitol Street Heliport
Until 1996, the Metropolitan Police Department (MPDC) operated eight helicopters, including three MD-500s and five Bell OH-58s.  The MPDC had heliports in the 2nd, 3rd, and 5th police districts. The helicopters were sold after budget cuts; the MPDC used National Park Service helicopters as needed.  In 2001, the MPDC obtained a new Eurocopter AS350, and flies it from the South Capitol Street Heliport at Buzzard Point.

From 1998 until the September 11 attacks, Air Pegasus operated helicopter sightseeing and other transportation services out of the South Capitol Street Heliport, but the federal government has not allowed it to resume operations due to security concerns.  WTTG Fox-5 also used the heliport from 1999 to 2001, then moved its operations elsewhere.  On November 10, 2010, District of Columbia Congressional delegate Eleanor Holmes Norton asked the TSA to allow the South Capitol Street Heliport to reopen for non-governmental use.

See also
 List of airports in Virginia
 List of airports in Maryland

References

Further reading

External links
 Potomac River Rescue Association

Airports in Washington, D.C.
Aviation in Washington, D.C.
Washington, D.C.
Washington, D.C.
Heliports
Washington, D.C.